Pronto... c'è una certa Giuliana per te is a 1967 Italian romantic comedy film  directed by Massimo Franciosa. For this film Mario Nascimbene won the Nastro d'Argento for Best Score.

Cast 
 Mita Medici: Giuliana 
 Gianni Dei: Paolo 
 Marina Malfatti: Annalisa 
 Françoise Prévost: mother of Paolo
 Paolo Ferrari: father of Paolo
 Caterina Boratto: Aunt Amelia 
 Silvia Dionisio: Stefania 
 Anna Mazzamauro: Marina

References

External links

1967 romantic comedy films
1967 films
Films directed by Massimo Franciosa
Films scored by Mario Nascimbene
Italian coming-of-age comedy films
Italian romantic comedy films
1960s coming-of-age comedy films
1960s Italian-language films
1960s Italian films